Formerum is a village on Terschelling in the province of Friesland, the Netherlands. It had a population of around 211 in January 2017.

The Oka 18 sank near this village. Until recently her funnel could be seen rising out from the sea. The village boasts a smock mill, the Koffiemolen.

It was the birthplace of the 16th century Dutch Arctic explorer Willem Barentsz.

Sources
Municipality guide Terschelling 2005-2006

References

Populated places in Friesland
Terschelling